The Duke of Reichstadt (German:Der Herzog von Reichstadt) is a 1920 Austrian silent film directed by Hans Otto and starring Rainer Simons, Käthe Schindler and Maria Mindzenty.

Cast
 Rainer Simons as Napoleon
 Käthe Schindler as Kaiserin Maria Louise
 Maria Mindzenty as Hermine Metternich  
 Annemarie Steinsieck as Helene Favour  
 Maria Pünkösdy as Marja  
 Paula Markl as Gräfin Schönstein  
 Hugo Werner-Kahle as Metternich
 Olaf Fjord as Herzog von Reichstadt und Alexander Wronsky  
 Frl. Pittner as Fanny Elssler
 Herr. Souzal as Kaiser Franz I.
 Robert Balajthy as Duval  
 Franz Weißmüller as Monthalva  
 Herr Roth as alter Diener

References

Bibliography
 Robert von Dassanowsky. Austrian Cinema: A History. McFarland, 2005.

External links

1920 films
Austrian silent feature films
Films directed by Hans Otto
1920s historical films
Austrian historical films
Films set in the 1820s
Films set in the 1830s
Depictions of Napoleon on film
Cultural depictions of Klemens von Metternich
Austrian black-and-white films
Films set in the Austrian Empire